Walton Harris Walker (December 3, 1889 – December 23, 1950) was a United States Army four-star general who served with distinction in World War I, World War II, and the Korean War, where he commanded the Eighth United States Army before dying in a jeep accident. He received two Distinguished Service Crosses for extraordinary heroism in World War II and the Korean War.

Early life
Walker was born in Belton, Texas, on December 3, 1889. His parents, Sam and Lydia Walker were both college graduates whose fathers had been officers in the Confederate Army. His father, a merchant, taught him how to ride a horse and to hunt and shoot. He graduated from the Wedemeyer Academy, a school which operated in Belton from 1886 to 1911. From a young age, he desired to go to United States Military Academy (USMA) at West Point, New York, and he hoped to be a general one day.

Early military career

Walker attended the Virginia Military Institute in preparation for his education at the USMA. He entered the Academy on June 15, 1907, but resigned on October 7, 1907. He reentered the Academy on March 3, 1908, and was commissioned a second lieutenant of Infantry on June 12, 1912.

As a lieutenant, Walker served at Fort Sheridan, Illinois; Fort Crockett, Texas;  Veracruz, Mexico; Galveston, Texas; and Fort Sam Houston, Texas, from June 1912 to May 1917. He was a member of the 1914 Veracruz expedition under Brigadier General Frederick Funston; patrolling on the U.S.-Mexican border in 1916, he developed a close friendship with Dwight D. Eisenhower. He was promoted to captain on May 15, 1917, a few weeks after the American entry into World War I. He served at Camp Funston, Texas, from May to December 1917, and Fort Sam Houston with the 13th Machine Gun Battalion from December 1917 to April 1918.

During World War I, Walker deployed to France with the 13th Machine Gun Company, 5th Machine Gun Battalion, 5th Division in April 1918, and, after being promoted to major on June 17, 1918, served as a company commander and then battalion commander to July 1919, by which time the war was over. He was awarded two Silver Stars for gallantry in action.

Between the wars
After the war, Walker rotated through a variety of assignments at Camp Benning, Georgia, and Fort Sill, Oklahoma, and served as a company commander and instructor at West Point from August 1923 to June 1925. He attended the Command and General Staff School at Fort Leavenworth, Kansas, from September 1925 to June 1926. He then served at Fort Monroe, Virginia, from June 1926 to July 1930. He next commanded the 2nd Battalion, 15th Infantry at Camp Burrowes, Chinwangtao (Qinhuangdao) and American Barracks, Tientsin, China, from September 1930 to March 1933.

He was promoted to lieutenant colonel on August 1, 1935, and, after attending the United States Army War College from August 1935 until June 1936, he served as post executive officer and then brigade executive officer with the 5th Infantry Brigade, 3rd Division, from August 1936 to June 1937; the brigade was commanded by George C. Marshall, the future Army Chief of Staff.

World War II

Walker served as a staff officer in the War Plans Division with the General Staff Corps in Washington, D.C. from August 1937 to April 1941. He next served as commanding officer of the 36th Infantry Regiment, which was activated April 15, 1941, as the 36th Infantry (Armored) and assigned to the 3rd Armored Division, June 1941; on January 1, 1942, it was redesignated the 36th Armored Infantry.

When Marshall (now Chief of Staff) assigned George Patton to organize America's armored forces, Walker successfully lobbied Marshall for a post as one of Patton's subordinate commanders, gaining promotion to brigadier general in the process. Promoted to major general in 1942; he commanded the 3rd Armored Division from August 1941 to August 1942.  After being succeeded by Leroy H. Watson, Walker became commanding general of IV Corps and then XX Corps (IV Armored Corps became XX Corps), taking the latter to England in February 1944 and leading it into combat in Normandy in July as part of Patton's Third Army. He was awarded a Silver Star for gallantry in action on July 7, 1944.

Walker's XX Corps played a role in Patton's dash across France in August and early September 1944, earning the sobriquet "Ghost Corps" for the speed of its advance. He received the Distinguished Service Cross for extraordinary heroism on August 23, 1944.  Walker's troops saw heavy fighting in France and Germany during the remainder of the war, especially at Metz, the Battle of the Bulge, and in the invasion of Germany.  In the spring of 1945, XX Corps liberated Buchenwald concentration camp, then pushed south and east, eventually reaching Linz, Austria by May. Walker received his third star at this time, making him a lieutenant general.

Walker received the unconditional surrender of Generaloberst Lothar Rendulic, commander of German Army Group South, on 7 May 1945.

Post-World War II
In May 1945, Walker returned to the United States. He was given command of the 8th Service Command, headquartered in Dallas, from May 1945 to May 1946. He was assigned as the commander of the Sixth Service Command and the Fifth Army, headquartered in Chicago, from May 1946 to September 1948, and then became commanding general of the U.S. Eighth Army, the American occupation force in Japan. Walker was ordered by General Douglas MacArthur, the Supreme Allied Commander in Japan, to restore the peacetime Eighth Army to combat-ready condition.

Korean War

At the end of World War II in 1945, Korea was divided into North Korea and South Korea, with North Korea (assisted by the Soviet Union) becoming a communist state after 1946, known as the Democratic People's Republic of Korea, followed by South Korea becoming the Republic of Korea (ROK). China became the communist People's Republic of China in 1949. In 1950, the Soviet Union backed North Korea while the United States backed South Korea, and China allied with the Soviet Union in what was to become the first military action of the Cold War.

Shortly after 75,000 North Korean troops with tanks invaded South Korea on June 25, 1950, American air and sea forces were ordered by President Harry S. Truman to give South Korean troops support. The U.S. Eighth Army was ordered to intervene and drive the invaders back across the 38th parallel, the border between the two countries.  With only four lightly equipped and poorly trained divisions, Walker began landing troops on the southeast side of the Korean peninsula in July. After his lead units, elements of the 24th Infantry Division (including the ill-fated Task Force Smith), were virtually destroyed in a few days of furious fighting between Osan and Taejon, Walker realized his assigned mission was impossible and went on the defensive. Pushed steadily back towards the southeast by the North Korean advance, Walker's forces suffered heavy losses and for a time were unable to form a defensible front, even after bringing the 1st Cavalry Division and 25th Infantry Division into the fight. 

Walker's situation was not helped by MacArthur's unrealistic demands from Tokyo for him not to retreat an inch.  Attempting to obey, Walker gave a bombastic "not a step back" speech to his staff and subordinate commanders which did not go over well.  Nor did it stop the North Korean troops from pushing back American and South Korea troops, which had been badly mauled in the opening days of the invasion, even further. As American and South Korean forces retreated further east and south, they finally arrived at a defensible line on the Nakdong River. They took advantage of shortened supply routes and a relatively good road network to exploit the advantages of interior lines.  Walker was able to quickly shift his units from point to point, stopping North Korean attacks before they could be reinforced.

A critical advantage Walker had was signals intelligence produced by the U.S. Armed Forces Security Agency (now the National Security Agency). This data enabled Walker to gain an indication of North Korean Army movements prior to attacks. Walker kept his main units deployed on the front lines, while retaining other U.S. Army and Marine Corps forces as a mobile reserve. His ability to better interpret North Korean intentions allowed him and his staff to better position his forces along the perimeter. It also allowed him to employ artillery and airpower more effectively.

American military forces gradually solidified this defensive position on the southeast side of the Korean peninsula, dubbed the "Pusan Perimeter". Walker received reinforcements, including the Provisional Marine Brigade, which he used along with the Army's 27th Infantry Regiment as "fire brigades," reliable troops who specialized in counterattacking and wiping out enemy penetrations. As more reinforcements arrived, the combat advantage shifted toward the United Nations forces. North Korean forces had suffered terribly and their supply lines were under constant aerial bombardment. Almost all of their Russian-made T-34 tanks, which had spearheaded the invasion, had been destroyed. Walker ordered local counterattacks, while planning for a large-scale breakout in conjunction with MacArthur's Inchon landing in September.

With MacArthur's amphibious flanking move, the North Koreans seemed trapped, but Walker's rapid advance northwest towards Inchon and Seoul emphasized speed over maneuver and made no attempt to encircle and destroy the North Koreans after punching through their lines. Although thousands of prisoners were taken, many North Korean units successfully disengaged from the fighting, melting away into the interior of South Korea, where they would conduct a guerrilla war for two years. Others escaped all the way back to North Korea. Walker was awarded the Distinguished Service Cross for extraordinary heroism from July 14 to September 28, 1950.

With the war apparently won, Walker's Eighth Army quickly moved north and, with the independent X Corps on its right, crossed the 38th parallel to occupy North Korea. Fighting tapered off to sporadic, sharp clashes with remnants of North Korean forces. By late October 1950, the Eighth Army was nearing the Yalu River, on the border between North Korea and China. MacArthur's headquarters had assured Walker that the Chinese would not intervene, so Walker's troops did not maintain watchful security. A gap opened between Eighth Army and X Corps as they advanced close to the Chinese border due to a lack of coordination between Walker, General Edward Almond, Commander of the X Corps, and MacArthur's headquarters in Tokyo. Eventually, the weather turned extremely cold, and most American units had no training and inadequate equipment for these bitter temperatures.

Contrary to MacArthur's expectations, the Chinese intervened in force on November 25, first in a series of ambushes, then in sporadic night attacks, and finally in an all-out offensive in which three Chinese armies infiltrated the lines, taking advantage of the American failure to take basic security measures, and the large gaps between American and South Korean units and between the Eighth Army and the X Corps. From late October until the beginning of December in 1950, the Chinese killed or captured thousands of American and ROK soldiers, decimating the 2nd Infantry Division and forcing Walker into a desperate retreat.

By early December, using his superior mobility, Walker successfully broke contact with the Chinese, withdrawing south to a position around Pyongyang, the capital of North Korea. Without instructions from MacArthur's headquarters, Walker decided that the Eighth Army was too battered to defend Pyongyang and ordered the retreat to resume to below the 38th parallel, saving most of the Eighth Army.

Death and burial
Walker was killed in a traffic accident on December 23, 1950, in Dobong District, Seoul (near Uijeongbu), South Korea, when his north-bound command jeep collided with a south-bound weapons carrier from a South Korean army division that had swung out of its lane. His body was escorted back to the United States by his son Sam Sims Walker, then a Company commander with the 19th Infantry Regiment, who was also serving in Korea. On January 2, 1951, he was posthumously promoted to general and his body was interred in Section 34 of Arlington National Cemetery.

Military awards and badges
Walker's decorations and awards, and badges, include:

Badges

Military promotions
Source – Official Register of the United States Army. 1946. pg. 713

Legacy and honors

Promoted posthumously to 4-star General, Walker's memory was much honored in the years immediately following the Korean War. The Army chose his name (and his other nickname), for its next light tank, the M41 Walker Bulldog. The M41 Tank was already nicknamed the Little Bulldog before Gen. Walker's death. The Army dropped the word Little and retained the name Bulldog as part of the new nickname for the M41 Tank.

In Dallas, Texas, the western segment of Texas State Highway Loop 12 was named after him (the portion going through neighboring Irving, Texas continues the naming convention).

In Belton, Texas, American Legion Post 55 is named after him.

One of the largest Armed Forces Recreation Center's hotels, the General Walker Hotel in Berchtesgaden (now demolished), was also named in his honor.

Camp Walker in Daegu, South Korea, is named in his honor.

In 1963, South Korea President Park Chung-hee honored Walker by naming a hill in the southern part of Seoul after him. Today, Walker Hill is the site of the Grand Walker Hill, a five-star international resort and hotel with its own full service casino. Also, Walker Hill Apartment is located in Gwangjin-gu.

In December 2009, the mayor of Dobong-gu district, Choi Sun-Kil, unveiled the Walton Harris Walker monument to mark the site of his death. The memorial, which is near Dobong subway Station, pays tribute to Walker and to all those who defended South Korea in the Korean War.

Walker Intermediate School which is located on the Fort Knox Army Garrison, was named after Walker and opened in 1962. His picture hangs in the school lobby.

A biography of Walker was published in 2008 titled General Walton H. Walker: Forgotten Hero-The Man Who Saved Korea, by Charles M. Province.

In popular culture
Walker was portrayed by Douglas Fowley in the 1963 film Miracle of the White Stallions, and by Garry Walberg in the 1977 film MacArthur.

References

Bibliography
 
 
 
 
 Monument unveiled for legendary U.S. Army general

External links

Generals of World War II
United States Army Officers 1939–1945

|-

|-

1889 births
1950 deaths
United States Army Infantry Branch personnel
Virginia Military Institute alumni
United States Army generals
United States Army personnel of World War I
United States Army personnel of the Korean War
American military personnel killed in the Korean War
Burials at Arlington National Cemetery
People from Belton, Texas
Recipients of the Distinguished Service Cross (United States)
Recipients of the Distinguished Service Medal (US Army)
Recipients of the Silver Star
Recipients of the Legion of Merit
Recipients of the Distinguished Flying Cross (United States)
Recipients of the Air Medal
Road incident deaths in South Korea
United States Military Academy alumni
United States Army generals of World War II
United States Army War College alumni
Military personnel from Texas
Recipients of the Croix de Guerre 1939–1945 (France)